Miguel Gálvez-Taroncher (born 1974 in Valencia) is a Spanish cultural manager and musician, trained in Madrid and Vienna.

Gálvez-Taroncher is director of the Chopin International Piano Competition in Granada. He was awarded the X Queen Elisabeth competition for his composition La luna y la muerte, which therefore was a mandatory work at the piano competition's finals.

Selective list of works 
 Alea, for clarinet, 1995.
 Nodos, for marimba, 1996.
 Gestus, for piano, 1996.
 El Velo, for piano, 1997.
 Poemas de la ladera este, for barytone and piano, 1998.
 Cercles, for piano, 1999.
 Ficciones, for violin and percussion, 2000.
 Strahlung, for bass clarinet and ensemble, 2000.
 Telar, for symphony orchestra, 2001. 
 Konzert für Bassklarinet und Ensemble, 2002.
 El sueño eterno, for string quartet, 2003. 
 Eclipse, for flute, violin and viola, 2003. 
 Mondszene, for piano with electronics, 2004.
 El gran inquisidor, for tenor, barytone and percussion, 2004.
 Noche de sollozos, for mezzo-soprano and symphony orchestra, 2005.
 La Luna y la Muerte, for piano and orchestra, 2006.
 Des Près-Variations, for six instruments. 
 Blick in die Wirrnis, for string quartet, 2007
 Kammerkonzert, 2007.
 Paisaje sonoro (homenaje a Jaime Sabines), for eight instruments, 2008.
 Llama de amor viva, Konzert für Violine, 2008.
 Konzert für Orchester, for symphony orchestra, 2008.
 "In Memoriam", for symphony orchestra, 2010.
 "Del Dolor Doblegado", for ensemble, 2010.
 "Interludios de la Canción Triste de la Mujer Maya", for clarinet and percussion, 2011.
 "U Payalchí'ob J'meno'ob", for two singers, baroque flute, percussions and electronics, 2012.
 "Concierto de Cámara nº 2" In Memoriam Carlos García Hirschfeld, for violin, cello, timpani and string orchestra, 2012.
 "En Busca del Tao en las Montañas de Otoño", for ensemble, 2012.
 "Preludio a Hendecameron", for mandoline, guitar and harp, 2012.
 "...que velo tus sueños y tu vigilia...", for vocal quartet and string quartet, 2013

References 
Queen Elisabeth Music Competition
Official Webpage of Miguel Gálvez-Taroncher

1974 births
Living people
Spanish composers
Spanish male composers
Prize-winners of the Queen Elisabeth Competition